Cardio is the 18th studio album by the Spanish Grammy-winning musician and actor Miguel Bosé. It was released on 9 March 2010. Cardio spent seven weeks on the Billboard Latin Pop Albums chart, peaking at No. 3, and five weeks on the Latin Albums chart, peaking at No. 7.

Track listing
 "Estuve a punto de..."
 "Júrame"
 "Dame argumentos"
 "Por ti"
 "A mí me da igual"
 "Cardio"
 "El perro"
 "¿Hay?"
 "La verdad"
 "Ayurvedico"
 "Y poco más"
 "Eso no"

Certifications

Personnel
Produced by Miguel Bose, Nicolas Sorin
Mixed by Andy Bradfield

References

2010 albums
Miguel Bosé albums